William Henry Seward, also known as Let Us Make the Treaty Tonight, the Monument to William H. Seward, and William H. Seward, is an outdoor bronze sculpture of William H. Seward by Richard Brooks, located in Volunteer Park in Seattle, Washington, United States. The statue was unveiled at the Alaska–Yukon–Pacific Exposition in 1909 and relocated to the park the following year. It cost $15,000 and was funded by private donors.

See also
 Sites and works regarding William H. Seward

References

External links

 
 Black and white postcard of the Seward Monument, Lincoln Financial Foundation Collection
 13 Seattle Icons Worth Keeping by Knute Berger  (August 2011), Seattle Magazine

1909 establishments in Washington (state)
1909 sculptures
Bronze sculptures in Washington (state)
Capitol Hill, Seattle
Monuments and memorials in Seattle
Outdoor sculptures in Seattle
Sculptures of men in Washington (state)
Statues in Seattle
World's fair sculptures
Alaska–Yukon–Pacific Exposition